HSM is an American company globally manufacturing materials and components for transportation, furniture, bedding and other markets. The closely held, family-owned firm is based in Hickory, North Carolina where it was founded in 1944 by Parks Underdown as the "Hickory Springs Manufacturing Company." In May 2013, the firm announced it was being rebranded as "HSM."

The company operates 25 plants employing over 2,500 workers in 13 states.

Overview
In March 2013,  the company   restructured into four business unit: transportation, furniture, bedding, and diversified markets. On May 6, 2013, a rebranding initiative consolidated several brand names and divisions under the trade name HSM, standing for  "High-value Solutions Manufacturing."

The C.E. White Company was acquired in 2012 to add capabilities in bus seating. A Corporate Innovation and Technology Center opened in 2012, offering R&D in advanced materials and manufacturing processes . In April 2013, the company broke ground for a 10,000-square-foot, $1.5 million foam technology facility in Conover, North Carolina.

HSM produces value-added materials and discrete and integrated components, which include: polyurethane reticulated foam formulations, drawn wire, springs, formed metal products, and fiber components. Integrated component systems include transportation seating, motion mechanism systems, and bed builds.

Leadership
Mark S. Jones, president and chief executive officer:

References

External links
 Company homepage

Companies based in North Carolina
United States